A microscopic theory is one that contains an explanation at the atomic or subatomic level in contrast to a higher level or classical macroscopic or phenomenological theory. e.g. in superconductivity BCS theory is a microscopic theory.

References

Atomic, molecular, and optical physics